The Priob or Ob (Priobskaya) is an endangered Russian breed of small horse from the Khanty-Mansi Autonomous Okrug, in Tyumen Oblast in the Russian Federation. It is distributed in the area of the Irtysh and lower Ob Rivers in western Siberia, and is a traditional breed of the indigenous people of that area, who used it for agriculture, for draft work, for forestry, and as a pack-horse.

History 

The Priob is a traditional breed of the indigenous peoples of Khanty-Mansi Autonomous Okrug. It was formerly known as the Ostyak-Vogul, from an older name for the okrug, Ostyak-Vogul National Okrug. It was also known by locals to the Narym Territory as the Narym horse (Нарымка, Narymka), and by the Mansi and Khanty people as the Vogulka horse (Вогулка, Vogulka). 

In 2007 the FAO listed the conservation status of the breed, based on data reported to the DAD-IS database, as "endangered".

Characteristics 

The conformation of the Priob is similar to that of the Narym and Yakut breeds of Siberia, but it is slightly larger. It may be either bay, or dun with primitive markings – a dorsal stripe, and zebra bars on the legs. It is hardy, fertile and long-lived, and is well adapted to the climatic conditions of the western Siberian plain, where the winters may be very harsh.

Use 

The traditional uses of the Priob were in agriculture, for draft work, in forestry, and as a pack-horse. 

In the twentieth century, under the Soviet régime, some use was made of it for cross-breeding with the Estonian Native.

References 

Horse breeds
Horse breeds originating in Russia